Still Waters is a 1915 silent film starring Marguerite Clark and directed by J. Searle Dawley. It was produced by Adolph Zukor's Famous Players Film Company. It was distributed by Paramount Pictures and is now lost.

Plot
Clark plays the daughter of a canal boat captain. She desires to visit the circus against her father's wishes as a bad experience happened years earlier when the captain's wife ran off with a circus performer. Clark eventually falls for a performer herself but is at odds with her father.

Cast

References

External links
Still Waters at IMDB.com
AllMovie.com

1915 films
American silent feature films
Lost American films
Films directed by J. Searle Dawley
Paramount Pictures films
1915 comedy-drama films
American black-and-white films
1915 lost films
Lost comedy-drama films
1910s American films
1910s English-language films
Silent American comedy-drama films